Autumn is a Dutch female fronted heavy rock band formed in 1995.

Members
Current members
 Jan Grijpstra – drums (1996–present)
 Jens van der Valk – guitars, backing vocals (2002–present)
 Mats van der Valk – guitars, backing vocals (2005–present)
 Jan Munnik – keyboards, programming (2006–present)
 Maurice van der Es – bass (2018–present)
 Marjan Welman – vocals (2008–present)
 Ronald Landa - guitars, backing vocals (2018-present)

Former members
 Meindert Sterk – bass, vocals (1995–2006)
 Bert Ferweda – guitars (1995–2001)
 Hildebrand van de Woude – drums (1995–1996)
 Menno Terpstra – keyboards (1996–2006)
 Welmoed Veersma – lead vocals, flute (1996–1999)
 Nienke de Jong – vocals (1999–2008)
 Jeroen Bakker – guitars (1999–2001)
 Jasper Koenders – guitars, flute (2001–2005)
 Jerome Vrielink – bass (2006–2012)
 Kevin Storm - bass (2012-2018)

Timeline
<div align="left">

Discography

Studio albums

Other releases

References

External links

 

Dutch gothic metal musical groups
Musical groups established in 1995
Musical groups from Groningen (city)
Metal Blade Records artists